Dain is a surname, and may refer to:

 Alphonse Dain (1896–1964), French Hellenist
 Claudia Dain, American author of romance novels
 Guy Dain (1870–1966), British physician
 Jack Dain (1912–2003), British–Australian Anglican bishop
 Killian Dain (born 1985), Irish wrestler
 Mungau Dain (1994–2019), ni-Vanuatu actor and villager
 Ralph Dain (1862–?), English footballer

See also
 Dáin (disambiguation)